Norman Wilfred Hill (born 22 August 1935) is a former English first-class cricketer. He had a 15-year career with Nottinghamshire and captained them in 1966 and 1967.

1935 births
Living people
English cricketers
Nottinghamshire cricketers
Nottinghamshire cricket captains
People from Holbeck
Marylebone Cricket Club cricketers
Players cricketers
Cricketers from Yorkshire